Rachel Morris is an English psychotherapist and counsellor, who practises in Manchester, England. She is also author of The Single Parent's Handbook and is a sex psychotherapist for Cosmopolitan magazine.

Television and radio
Morris has appeared as an expert on several television programmes including Help I'm a Teen Mum on ITV1, Tool Academy, Wife Swap The Aftermath on E4, Little Angels and Say No to the Knife (2006) for BBC Three,  Would Like to Meet, The Oprah Winfrey Show, Big Brother's Little Brother and the Big Brother Psych Show. She has acted as off screen psychotherapist for ITV1's Celebrity Love Island and 'E' Entertainment's Perfect Catch.

She has also appeared as an expert guest on BBC Radio 1's Sunday Surgery, Radio 2's Jeremy Vine Show and is a regular guest on several Radio 5 Live talk shows.

Writing
Morris is also a consultant for Cosmopolitan and for the BBC website's Relationships section.

Author of The Single Parent's Handbook. (Pearson,)

References

Year of birth missing (living people)
Living people
British psychotherapists
People in health professions from Manchester